Modderfontein can refer to:

 Battle of Elands River (1901)
 Modderfontein Commando
 Modderfontein (East Rand)
 Modderfontein Stadium